The Stal-2 was a Russian mid-range passenger aircraft.

Development and design
The Stal-2 was designed by the OOS (Otdel Opytnogo Samolyetostroeniya – section for experimental aircraft construction), the part of the NII GVF (Nauchno-issledovatel'sky Institut Grazdahnskovo Vozdushnogo Flota – civil air fleet scientific research institute), and built at Tushino GAZ-81 (Gosudarstvenny Aviatsionnyy Zavod – Tushino state aviation factory). It was a high-wing braced monoplane with an enclosed cockpit and passenger cabin, constructed of Enerzh-6 stainless steel. Trial flights began in 1931, but due to the experimental technology being used in its design and construction, production did not begin until 1934. 111 were produced before being replaced in 1935 on the production line by the Stal-3.
The prototype was powered by an imported Wright J-6, early production aircraft used Bessonov M-26 engines with the bulk of production using Nazarov MG-31 engines.In 1934 the plane was shown at the 14th Paris Air Show.

Variants
 Stal-2 bis – A single Stal-2 bis was built with frise ailerons.

Operators

Aeroflot

Specifications

See also

References

 History of aircraft construction in the USSR, V.B.Shavrov; 
 Gunston, Bill. "The Osprey Encyclopaedia of Russian Aircraft 1875–1995". London, Osprey. 1995.

External links
 http://ram-home.com/ram-old/stal-2.html

1930s Soviet airliners
OOS aircraft